Valentina Olivia Violeta Lizana Wallner (born 30 March 1990) is a Swedish retired ice hockey goaltender and coach.

International career
Lizana Wallner was selected for the Sweden women's national ice hockey team in the 2010 Winter Olympics, but did not play during the tournament.

Lizana Wallner also appeared for Sweden at the 2009 IIHF Women's World Championship, playing in four games, winning three and finishing with a goals against average of 1.25. She also played twice at the 2013 IIHF Women's World Championship, losing both games, and allowing 6 goals on 49 shots.

She also represented her country at junior level, playing for the Sweden women's national under-18 ice hockey team. In 2008, she played in four games, winning two, with a goals against average of 2.66.

Lizana Wallner played also for Sweden the 2014 Olympics in Sochi. She wanted to have the face of Stefan Liv on her Helmet, but was refused by the International Olympic Committee.

Personal life 
Lizana Wallner's father is from Chile, and her mother is Finnish.

Career statistics

International career

References

External links

1990 births
Living people
AIK Hockey Dam players
Djurgårdens IF Hockey Dam players
Ice hockey players at the 2010 Winter Olympics
Ice hockey players at the 2014 Winter Olympics
Modo Hockey Dam players
Olympic ice hockey players of Sweden
Ice hockey people from Stockholm
Swedish people of Chilean descent
Swedish women's ice hockey goaltenders